"Can't Get Over You" is a 1989 single by Maze featuring Frankie Beverly.  The single was the first release the group had in almost three years, as well as being their debut release on the Warner Bros. Records label.  "Can't Get Over You" was the group's second and final number one on the Hot Black Singles chart.

References

1989 singles
1989 songs
Warner Records singles
Torch songs
Maze (band) songs
1980s ballads
Song articles with missing songwriters